State Route 191 (SR 191) is a state highway in the U.S. state of California. Known also as Clark Road, it is a spur route off of State Route 70 in Butte County, providing a connection to the town of Paradise.

Route description
The route begins at State Route 70 near Oroville. It then heads northward through Butte County and intersects Durham-Pentz Road.  It then ends at Pearson Road in Paradise.

SR 191 is not part of the National Highway System, a network of highways that are considered essential to the country's economy, defense, and mobility by the Federal Highway Administration.

Construction of California State Route 191 was planned in 1962 but wasn't constructed due to U.S. Route 40 Alternate (now California State Route 70) not being moved upward due to Lake Oroville. Construction started in 1963 when U.S. Route 40 Alternate was moved. 

The route was completed in 1964 and opened the same year.

Major intersections

See also

References

External links

California @ AARoads.com - State Route 191
Caltrans: Route 191 highway conditions
California Highways: SR 191

191
State Route 191
Paradise, California